The Oskar Klein Memorial Lecture at Stockholm University, dedicated to the memory of the Swedish physicist Oskar Klein (1894-1977), is held annually  since 1988 by a prominent physicist, who also receives the Oskar Klein Medal. The lecture is sponsored by the university and the Nobel Committee of the Royal Swedish Academy of Sciences.

List of lecturers and recipients of the Medal
Source: 

2022 - Igor R. Klebanov
2020 - Roy Kerr
2019 - Lisa Randall
2018 - Leonard Susskind
2017 - Sheldon Glashow
2016 - Kip S. Thorne
2015 - Rashid Sunyaev
2014 - Andrew Strominger
2013 - Frank Wilczek
2012 - Juan Maldacena
2011 - Joseph Silk
2010 - Alexei A. Starobinsky
2009 - Peter Higgs
2008 - Helen Quinn
2007 - Gabriele Veneziano
2006 - Viatcheslav Mukhanov
2005 - Yoichiro Nambu
2004 - Pierre Ramond
2003 - Stephen Hawking
2002 - Martin Rees
2001 - Andrei Linde
2000 - David Gross
1999 - Gerard 't Hooft
1998 - Edward Witten
1997 - P. J. E. Peebles
1996 - Alexander Polyakov
1995 - Nathan Seiberg
1994 - The Oskar Klein Centenary Symposium, September 19-21, 1994
1993 - Tsung-Dao Lee
1992 - John A. Wheeler
1991 - Alan Guth
1990 - Hans Bethe
1989 - Steven Weinberg
1988 - Chen Ning Yang

See also

 List of physics awards

External links

References

Stockholm University
Royal Swedish Academy of Sciences
Physics awards
Lecture series